Rudolf Wåhlin (2 November 1887 – 21 April 1972) was a Swedish long-distance runner. He competed in the marathon at the 1920 Summer Olympics.

References

External links
 

1887 births
1972 deaths
Athletes (track and field) at the 1920 Summer Olympics
Swedish male long-distance runners
Swedish male marathon runners
Olympic athletes of Sweden
People from Heby Municipality
Sportspeople from Uppsala County